The Isaac Elementary School District (often Isaac School District) is one of several K-8 school districts within the city limits of Phoenix, Arizona. The attendance boundaries are Van Buren Street to the south, 51st Avenue to the west, 19th Avenue to the east, and (roughly) Thomas Road to the north, with a small portion extending north to Indian School Road and 43rd Avenue. The district operates seven K-5 schools, 1 K-8 school, and two 6-8 schools. It feeds in Phoenix Union High School District

Schools
 K-8 school
 Pueblo del Sol ("Town/Village of the Sun" or "People of the Sun")

 Middle schools
 Isaac Middle School
 Morris K. Udall Middle School 

 Elementary schools
 Alta E. Butler Elementary School
 P.T. Coe Elementary School
 Esperanza Elementary School
 Mitchell Elementary School
 Moya Elementary School
 J.B. Sutton Elementary School
 Joseph Zito Elementary School

 Preschool
 Bret Tarver Preschool

External links
 Official site

School districts in Arizona
School districts in Phoenix, Arizona]
School districts in Maricopa County, Arizona